Gay Street is a hamlet in the Horsham District of West Sussex, England. It lies on the North Heath to West Chiltington road 1.9 miles (3.1 km) northeast of Pulborough.

Horsham District
Villages in West Sussex